Elections to the Baseball Hall of Fame for 1993 followed the system in place since 1978. The Baseball Writers' Association of America (BBWAA) voted by mail to select from recent major league players and 
elected Reggie Jackson. The Veterans Committee met in closed sessions to consider older major league players as well as managers, umpires, executives, and figures from the Negro leagues; it selected no one. A formal induction ceremony was held in Cooperstown, New York, on August 1, 1993.

BBWAA election
The BBWAA was authorized to elect players active in 1973 or later, but not after 1987; the ballot included candidates from the 1992 ballot who received at least 5% of the vote but were not elected, along with selected players, chosen by a screening committee, whose last appearance was in 1987. All 10-year members of the BBWAA were eligible to vote.

Voters were instructed to cast votes for up to 10 candidates; any candidate receiving votes on at least 75% of the ballots would be honored with induction to the Hall. The ballot consisted of 32 players; a total of 423 ballots were cast, with 318 votes required for election. A total of 2,437 individual votes were cast, an average of 5.76 per ballot—a record low up to this point, and the first BBWAA election to average fewer than 6 names per ballot. Those candidates receiving less than 5% of the vote will not appear on future BBWAA ballots, but may eventually be considered by the Veterans Committee.

Candidates who were eligible for the first time are indicated here with a dagger (†). The one candidate who received at least 75% of the vote and was elected is indicated in bold italics; candidates who have since been elected in subsequent elections are indicated in italics. The 11 candidates who received less than 5% of the vote, thus becoming ineligible for future BBWAA consideration, are indicated with an asterisk (*).

The newly-eligible players included 27 All-Stars, twelve of whom were not included on the ballot, representing a total of 78 All-Star selections. Among the new candidates were 14-time All-Star Reggie Jackson, 10-time All-Star Steve Garvey, 6-time All-Star Ron Cey and 5-time All-Star Cecil Cooper. The field included two MVPs (Jackson and Garvey) and one Rookie of the Year (Gary Matthews).

Players eligible for the first time who were not included on the ballot were: Len Barker, Dale Berra, Ray Burris, Dan Driessen, Mike Easler, Jamie Easterly, Mike Fischlin, George Frazier, Johnny Grubb, Moose Haas, Al Holland, Tom Hume, Clint Hurdle, Ruppert Jones, Lee Lacy, Ken Landreaux, Gary Lavelle, Johnnie LeMaster, Aurelio Lopez, Rick Manning, Charlie Moore, Jorge Orta, Tom Paciorek, Lenn Sakata, Joe Sambito, Bob Shirley, Roy Smalley, Sammy Stewart, U L Washington, and Rob Wilfong.

J. G. Taylor Spink Award 
Leonard Koppett (1923–2003) and Bus Saidt (1920–1989) received the J. G. Taylor Spink Award honoring baseball writers. The awards were voted at the December 1992 meeting of the BBWAA, and included in the summer 1993 ceremonies.

References

External links
1993 Election at www.baseballhalloffame.org

Baseball Hall of Fame balloting
Hall of Fame balloting